"By Any Other Name" is a second-season episode of Star Trek: The Original Series.

By Any Other Name may also refer to:

 By Any Other Name, a short story collection by Spider Robinson
 A novella by the same author, expanded into the novel Telempath
 "By Any Other Name", a short story by Santha Rama Rau
 "By Any Other Name", an episode of the British television series Holby City (series 5)
 By Any Other Name (album), a Future Sound of London compilation release
 "By Any Other Name", a song by Holman Autry Band

See also
 Bi Any Other Name, a 1991 anthology of works by bisexual authors
 "Any Other Name", a song by Thomas Newman, used in the movie American Beauty